Susie Coelho is an American television personality, author, and businesswoman.

Early life
Susie Coelho was born in Cuckfield, Sussex, England on December 7, 1953 to George and Rani Coelho. She is of Indian heritage and grew up in Bethesda, Maryland. She attended the American University in Washington DC.

Career 
Early in her career, Coelho worked as a model signed to Ford Models, an actress, and entertainment reporter. In 1982, she played the role of an art teacher in the film Breakin' 2: Electric Boogaloo. In 1983, as a journalist, she travelled to India to interview Phoolan Devi, known as “The Bandit Queen” of Central India, while she was a fugitive from justice. She also co-founded the restaurant Bono's in Hollywood, in addition to the fashion boutique A Star is Worn.

In 1997, Susie Coelho founded Susie Coelho Enterprises, Inc. She was an on-air contributor to The View and the Today Show. She was the host of the HGTV television series Surprise Gardener and Outer Spaces. She has also authored four lifestyle books, Everyday Styling (Simon & Schuster 2002), Styling for Entertaining (Simon & Schuster 2004), Secrets of a Style Diva: A Get-Inspired Guide to Your Creative Side (Thomas Nelson 2006), and Style Your Dream Wedding (Thomas Nelson 2008). She was awarded the Women in Film & Video-DC Women of Vision Awards in 2007.

Design
In 2019, Coelho founded House of Sussex, a fashion accessories brand focusing on collaborations with artists, creating backpacks using former street and tattoo artists designs, and also jewelry. In addition to being for sale, her pieces have been displayed in museums. She has also designed furnishings and accessories for retail: Mervyn's with “Susie Coelho Style”, Grandin Road through a Signature Collection, and QVC with “Susie Coelho Home”.

Personal life
Coelho was married to Sonny Bono from 1981 to 1984, having been in a relationship with him since the mid-1970s. She was then married to Robert Rounds with whom she shares two children. She has been married to Michael A. Peel since 2017.

References

Living people
People from Bethesda, Maryland
American University alumni
American models
American film actresses
American television hosts
American fashion designers
21st-century American non-fiction writers
American company founders
American women company founders
American women television presenters
1953 births
American women fashion designers
21st-century American actresses